The discography of American rock band The Avett Brothers consists of 10 studio albums, four live albums and five extended plays (EPs). The band was formed in 2000 in Mount Pleasant, North Carolina by Scott Avett and Seth Avett, who were later joined by Bob Crawford in 2001 and Joe Kwon in 2006.

Albums

Studio albums

Live albums

EPs

Singles

Other album appearances
 Pickathon Music Festival 2006 – "November Blue" (2006)
 WYEP Live & Direct: Volume 8 – "Swept Away" (2007)
 Live at KEXP Vol.5 – "The Weight of Lies" (2009) 
 WFPK Live: Volume Four – "I and Love and You" (2009) 
 Broken Hearts & Dirty Windows: Songs of John Prine – "Spanish Pipedream" cover (2010) 
 My Favorite Gifts – "I Thank God" cover (2011)
 WYEP Live & Direct: Volume 14 – "Tear Down the House" (2012) 
 Chimes of Freedom: The Songs of Bob Dylan – "One Too Many Mornings" cover with remixed archival recordings of Johnny Cash (2012)
 Still the King: Celebrating the Music of Bob Wills and His Texas Playboys – "The Girl I Left Behind Me" cover with Asleep at the Wheel (2015)
 GNWMT: Ten Year Anniversary Recording to Benefit MyMusicRx – "One Line Wonder" (2016)
 Music from The American Epic Sessions: Original Motion Picture Soundtrack – "Closer Walk With Thee" cover and "Jordan Am a Hard Road to Travel" cover (2017)

Music videos

References

Rock music group discographies
Discographies of American artists